The Ndjébbana language, also spelt Djeebbana and  Ndjebanna and also known as Kunibidji (Gunavidji, Gunivugi, Gombudj), is a Burarran language spoken by the Gunavidji (Ndjebbana) people of North-central Arnhem Land in the Northern Territory of Australia.

"Gunavidji" (and variant forms) is an exonym used by speakers of Kunbarlang, Kunwinjku and Maung languages.

References

Further reading

Auld, Glenn. 2002. The role of the computer in learning Ndjébbana. Language learning and technology 6(2): 41-58.
Auld, Glenn. 2002. Computer assisted Ndjébbana. Practically Primary 7(3): 20-22.
Auld, Glenn. 2005. The literacy practices of Kunibídji children: Text, technology and transformation. PhD thesis, University of Ballarat.
Capell, Arthur. 1942. Languages of Arnhem Land, North Australia. Oceania, 12 (4), 364-392.
Elwell, Vanessa. 1977. Multilingualism and lingua francas among Australian Aborigines: A case study of Maningrida. Honours Thesis, Australian National University.
Elwell, Vanessa. 1982. Some social factors affecting multilingualism among Aboriginal Australians: a case study of Maningrida. International Journal of the Sociology of Language 36: 83-103.
Green, Rebecca. 2003. Proto Maningrida within Proto Arnhem: evidence from verbal inflectional suffixes. In N. Evans (ed.), The non-Pama-Nyungan languages of Northern Australia: comparative studies of the continent's most linguistically complex region (pp. 369–421). Canberra: Pacific Linguistics.
Handelsmann, Robert. 1996. Needs Survey of Community Languages: Central Arnhem Land, Northern Territory (Maningrida and Outstations). Report to the Aboriginal and Torres Strait Islander Commission, Canberra.
Jones, Peter. 1987. The Kunibidji Bilingual Program Handbook. Maningrida School: Maningrida.
Maningrida CEC's Literature Production Centre, 2009. My own Ndjébbana dictionary : a b d dj e i k l m n ng nj o r rd rl rn rr u w ya. Winnelie, N.T.: Maningrida CEC.
McKay, Graham R. 1984. Stop Alternations in Ndjébbana (Kunibidji) + Comments on Waters' Comments on Gemination in Rembarnga. Pacific Linguistics. Series A: Occasional Papers.
McKay, Graham R. 1996. Body parts, possession marking and nominal classes in Ndjébbana. In H. Chappell and W. McGregor (eds) The Grammar of inalienability : a typological perspective on body part terms and the part-whole relation. Berlin; New York : M. de Gruyter. pp. 293–326.
McKay, Graham. 2000. Ndjébbana. In R.M.W. Dixon & B.J. Blake (eds), The handbook of Australian languages: Volume 5 (pp. 155–354). Melbourne: Oxford University Press.

Maningrida languages
Indigenous Australian languages in the Northern Territory